Foster exists in memory as a pioneer Texas community that is located in Fort Bend County, Texas, United States along Farm to Market Road 359, beginning approximately  northwest of its intersection with Farm to Market Road 723.   It is considered by local homeowners to be an unincorporated community.

History - Pioneer Texas Community

John Foster

Old Three Hundred Colonist 
John was one of the Old Three Hundred who were granted land in Stephen F. Austin's Texas colony.  A Texas Historical Marker captures the history of the father, John Foster, who was one of the original 300 Hundred who settled in Texas with Stephen Austin in the 1820s.

The Texas Historical maker on John Foster(located on John and Randolph Foster High School, 4400 FM 723] states:John Foster John Foster was born on May 25, 1757, in South Carolina to William James and Mary (Hill) Foster. Family history indicates he may have served with his brothers in Charleston against a British attack in June 1776. He married Rachel (Gibson), and they had at least six children, four of whom eventually lived in Texas. About 1781, the Fosters crossed the Appalachians and traveled almost 2,000 miles by flatboat to the Spanish-occupied Natchez District of present-day Mississippi. There, Foster became a substantial landowner and cattleman. After Rachel died, he married Mary (Smith) Kelsey, and of their seven children, three would come to Texas. After Mississippi Territory was created in 1798, Foster opposed the decrees of the appointed governor and petitioned Congress for an elected legislature. He established the town of Washington, and after it became the territorial capital in 1802, helped found Jefferson College. In 1822, Foster joined his son Randolph in Texas and became one of Stephen F. Austin's "Old Three Hundred" colonists. In 1824, he received an 11,600-acre grant in what is now Fort Bend County. He is believed to have established a school on his property that eventually became the Foster Community School. On December 25, 1835, John Foster signed the Columbia Resolutions urging Texas' declaration of independence from Mexico. Leaving behind four sons to support the struggle for Texas independence, Foster went to Wilkinson County, Mississippi, in early 1836 to live in retirement at the home of one of his daughters. He died there on January 26, 1837.

Land Grant 
The Texas Historical maker on the John Foster Land Grant (located on Winner-Foster Rd, 1 mile from the intersection of Winner-Foster and FM 359] states:John Foster (1757-1837) came to Texas in 1822 as a member of Stephen F. Austin's "Old Three Hundred" colony. He received a grant of about 12,000 acres of land from the Mexican government. Following his death the land was divided among his ten children. A community which grew up in the area was named Foster. Over the years the Foster lands have yielded abundant wildlife and numerous agricultural products, including cotton, rice, pecans, and sugar cane. Twentieth-century land uses have included housing developments and oil and gas production. (1989)

Randolph Foster 
The community was founded by Randolph Foster, the son of John Foster.

Old Three Hundred Colonist 
The Texas Historical maker on John Foster(located on John and Randolph Foster High School, 4400 FM 723] states: Randolph Foster was an early Old 300 Texas pioneer who made his home on his land grant that straddled northwest Fort Bend County and southwest Waller County. Prior to settling in Austin’s Colony he served under Randal Jones, another of the Old 300, in the War of 1812. Born in Mississippi in 1790, he found himself in Texas not long after his wartime service ended. He explored and hunted throughout much of Texas and even camped for a time in what would be Fort Bend County. In 1821, he helped Stephen F. Austin in one of his early surveying trips in Texas.

In 1824, Randolph Foster received his land grant on some of the same land he had hunted a few years earlier. Soon thereafter, his father John and brother Isaac also joined him in Texas. John’s land grant is not far from Randolph’s on the north side of the Brazos northwest of Rosenberg. After John arrived, he started a school for his family, which became the Foster Community School. Randolph kept this school in operation after his father died in 1837.Randolph's role as chief scout for Stephen F. Austin was depicted in the 1875 painting "The Settlement of Austin's Colony" that hangs in the Texas House of Representative Chamber in Austin, Texas.This 1875 oil-on-canvas painting by Henry McArdle portrays "Father of Texas" Stephen F. Austin rallying his colonists against the tribe around 1824. "The Settlement of Austin's Colony" also features Austin colony commissioner Baron de Bastrop (left), Secretary of the Colony Samuel L. Williams (right), chief scout Ran Foster (bottom right), Austin's cook Simon (window), and surveyor Horatio Chriesman (bottom left). The painting hangs permanently in the House of Representatives Chamber at the Texas state capitol building in Austin.

Randolph Foster Builds a Camp, 1821 
The 2004 Texas Historical maker on the Foster Community  (located on FM 359 1.4 mi. from FM 723  [4 mi. NW of Rosenberg] states:The Foster community began in the fall of 1821 as a permanent campsite settled by Randolph Foster (1790-1887) on what was then one of the largest single land grants in Texas (11,601 acres). The John Foster grant, deeded by Stephen F. Austin, came from the relationship between Foster, his father John (1757-1837) and Austin. John was one of Austin's "Old Three Hundred" colonists, and Foster family members participated in the Texas War for Independence. Sugar cane was the area's dominant industry in the 1840s, and Foster community thrived from its production and export. Other crops that benefited the community included pecans and cotton. Local residents tamed wild horses found on the upland prairies for domestic use and trade. The community's first school, which offered up to grade five, was held in Randolph Foster's home before construction of a one-room schoolhouse also used for early community religious services. African American students studied at Jones Creek School. The community's first post office initiated mail service from the area's general store in 1882. The volume of local sugar production was so great that in the 1920s, Imperial Sugar Company built a railroad between Foster community and mills in Sugar Land. In 1928, Sugar Land Industries bought acreage in this area and named it Foster Farms. By the end of World War II, several factors led to the community's decline: the end of area sugar crops; the closing of the railroad; the Great Depression; and changes in ownership and farming techniques. In 1944, the community's schools, post office and general store closed. Today, adjacent to Houston, the state's largest urban area, Foster exists in memory as a pioneer Texas community. (2005)

Texas Revolution, 1830s 
During the Revolution, he helped to supply Sam Houston’s army and aided Wiley Martin in defending the Brazos crossing at Thompson’s Ferry from the Mexicans. The Texians delayed the Mexican army long enough to allow the Texian government time to escape Harrisburg. After this battle, he escorted his family and that of his neighbors as they traveled east during the Runaway Scrape.

The Foster Plantation, 1830s-1870s 
The Foster plantation flourished in the years after the Revolution, producing rice and sugar cane in the fertile Fort Bend County soil.

Boom and Bust, 1880s - 1930s 
The Foster settlement was established in 1882.   In that year, a post office was established in Foster, which was on a route connecting the Fort Bend County center, Richmond, Texas, with Hempstead, Texas in Waller county.  Soon thereafter, Foster had semiweekly mail delivery, a steam gristmill,and cotton gin, a physician, and a population of sixty.  By the mid-1890s,   the town had daily mail delivery, three gristmills, a general store, and a flour mill.   Like in many other local communities, schools were established.  By 1897 the community had two schools, one for white students and one for black.

The community's population dwindled to forty in the 1920s.   By the early 1930s, only one business was reported, and no population figures were listed.

The two community schools and the post office remained open until they were closed in the early 1940s.

Modern Day Community 
Since the mid-twentieth-century, land uses have included cattle ranching, pecan groves, cotton and corn farming, housing developments, and oil and gas production.

Hurricane Harvey 
Hurricane Harvey was a devastating Category 4 hurricane that made landfall on Texas and Louisiana in August 2017, causing catastrophic flooding and many deaths.  In the Foster communities, many homes were impacted by the flood either with forced evacuations and/or significant flood damage.  This area sits in one of many flood plains associated with the Brazos River all throughout Fort Bend County.

The Old Foster Community Museum 
A museum dedicated to the Foster Community is located on FM 359 near the intersection of FM 723.    The museum is located in a restored old school house built in the 1920s that was moved from its original location south of Jones Creek on Foster Farms.  As a 501(c) organization, their motto is to "Bring a Piece of the Past to the Present" with the mission of "Saving our heritage and community history one step at a time."    Besides tours, the organization donates money to the Lamar Consolidated ISD Scholarship Program and other community projects such as the Christmas Adopt a Family Program.

Government and infrastructire
Fort Bend County does not have a hospital district. OakBend Medical Center serves as the county's charity hospital which the county contracts with.

References

External links

Unincorporated communities in Fort Bend County, Texas
Unincorporated communities in Texas